Belinda is a monotypic moth genus in the subfamily Lymantriinae. Its only species, Belinda zoe, is found in Indonesia. Both the genus and species were first described by Alexander Schintlmeister and Thomas J. Witt in 2014.

References

External links
Original description: Schintlmeister, Alexander & Witt, Thomas J. (2014). "Eine neue Lymantride aus Sulawesi, Belinda zoe gen. n. et sp. n. (Lepidoptera: Lymantriidae)". Entomofauna. 35 (24): 533–540.  with English abstract.

Lymantriinae